Al Pacino is an American screen and stage actor. His film debut was in 1969 with the American comedy-drama film Me, Natalie. He then had his first lead role in the 1971 drama film The Panic in Needle Park. The following year, he played Michael Corleone in the crime film The Godfather. A role he reprised in the sequels The Godfather Part II (1974) and The Godfather Part III (1990). For his role in the 1973 film Serpico, where he played Frank Serpico, he won the Golden Globe Award for Best Actor in a Motion Picture Drama. In 1983, he starred as Tony Montana in the crime drama film Scarface, which is considered one of the greatest gangster films ever made and regarded as a cult classic.

In the 1990s, Pacino starred in numerous films including Frankie and Johnny with Michelle Pfeiffer (1991), as Richard Roma in Glengarry Glen Ross (1992), Scent of a Woman with Chris O'Donnell (1992), Carlito's Way with Sean Penn (1993), Heat with Robert De Niro (1995), as Benjamin "Lefty" Ruggiero in Donnie Brasco (1997), The Devil's Advocate with Keanu Reeves (1997), and Any Given Sunday with Cameron Diaz (1999). For his role in Scent of a Woman, he won the Academy Award for Best Actor and his second Golden Globe Award for Best Actor in a Motion Picture Drama.

Since the early 2000s, he's co-starred in the films Insomnia opposite Robin Williams (2002), Simone with Catherine Keener (2002), and the thriller film 88 Minutes (2007). In 2007, he was cast as Willie Bank in the heist comedy film Ocean's Thirteen, the third installment in the Ocean's franchise, and the final film in the Ocean's Trilogy. The following year, he appeared in the action thriller film Righteous Kill, again with De Niro. In 2019, he had both a minor role in Quentin Tarantino's comedy-drama film Once Upon a Time in Hollywood and portrayed Jimmy Hoffa in The Irishman, the fourth film he and De Niro worked on together. In 2021, he portrayed Aldo Gucci in the biographical crime drama film House of Gucci directed by Ridley Scott.

Pacino's television work includes the 2003 HBO miniseries Angels in America where he played American lawyer and prosecutor Roy Cohn and the 2010 made-for-television biopic You Don't Know Jack where he played American pathologist and euthanasia proponent Dr. Jack Kevorkian. For both roles, he received the Golden Globe Award for Best Actor – Miniseries or Television Film, making it his third and fourth Golden Globe Award. He also co-stars in the conspiracy drama streaming television series Hunters (2020–2023).

Film

Documentaries

Television

Stage

Video games

See also
List of awards and nominations received by Al Pacino

References

External links 
 

Male actor filmographies
American filmographies